DXBP (97.5 FM), broadcasting as 97.5 Sure FM, is a radio station owned and operated by Iddes Broadcast Group. The station's studio is located in Tandag.

References

Radio stations in Surigao del Sur